Punjuba is a genus in the family Fabaceae. It is native to Costa Rica, as well as to western South America.

Taxonomy

Species
Punjuba  has 6 accepted species:
Punjuba callejasii (Barneby & J.W.Grimes) M.V.B.Soares, M.P.Morim & Iganci
Punjuba centiflora (Barneby & J.W.Grimes) M.V.B.Soares, M.P.Morim & Iganci
Punjuba josephi (Barneby & J.W.Grimes) M.V.B.Soares, M.P.Morim & Iganci
Punjuba killipii Britton & Rose
Punjuba lehmannii Britton & Rose
Punjuba racemiflora (Donn.Sm.) Britton & Rose

Phylogeny
Punjuba is the sister group to the remaining genera of the Jupunba-Alliance (Jupunba, Balizia, Hydrochorea), as can be seen in the following cladogram:

References

Fabaceae genera
Mimosoids